Lourdes Ortega (born 1962) is a Spanish-born American linguist. She is currently a professor of applied linguistics at Georgetown University. Her research focuses on second language acquisition and second language writing. She is noted for her work on second language acquisition and for recommending that syntactic complexity needs to be measured multidimensionally.

Career 
Ortega received her Master of Arts in English as a second language in 1995 and her Doctor of Philosophy in Second language acquisition in 2000 from the University of Hawaii at Manoa. She taught applied linguistics in graduate programs at Georgia State University between 2000-2002, Northern Arizona University between 2002-2004, University of Hawaii at Manoa between 2004-2012, and Georgetown University since 2012.

She is the Currents in Language Learning Series Editor & Associate General Editor of the Language Learning: A Journal of Research in Language Studies, a peer-reviewed academic journal.

Research
Ortega is noted  in the field of second language acquisition for her  paper entitled "Towards an Organic Approach to Investigating CAF in Instructed SLA: The Case of Complexity", published in Applied Linguistics in which she claimed along with John Norris that syntactic complexity need to be measured multidimensionally.

Awards
2000: TESOL Distinguished research
2001: The Modern Language Journal /ACTFL Paul Pimsleur

Bibliography

Books
Understanding Second Language Acquisition. (2009)

Articles
"Effectiveness of L2 instruction: A research synthesis and quantitative meta‐analysis." (2000)
"The role of implicit negative feedback in SLA: Models and recasts in Japanese and Spanish." (1998)
"Planning and focus on form in L2 oral performance." (1999)
"Syntactic complexity measures and their relationship to L2 proficiency: A research synthesis of college‐level L2 writing." (2003)
"Towards an organic approach to investigating CAF in instructed SLA: The case of complexity." (2009)

References

External links 
 

1962 births
Living people
Applied linguists
Second language writing
Linguists from Spain
Ortega, Lourdes
Georgetown University faculty
Women linguists
Academic journal editors